Mark Philip David Billingham (born 2 July 1961) is an English novelist, actor, television screenwriter and comedian whose series of "Tom Thorne" crime novels are best-sellers in that genre.

Early years
Billingham was born in Solihull, Warwickshire and grew up in Moseley, Birmingham. He attended the King Edward VI Camp Hill School for Boys in nearby King's Heath, and lived in that general area "right the way through university" while attending the nearby University of Birmingham.

After graduating with a degree in drama from the Department of Drama and Theatre Arts, he stayed in Birmingham and helped form a socialist theatre company (Bread & Circuses). Bread & Circuses toured with a number of shows in schools, colleges, arts centres and the street. In the mid-1980s he moved from Birmingham to London as a "jobbing actor", taking minor roles in episodes of TV shows Dempsey and Makepeace, Juliet Bravo, Boon, and The Bill. After finding himself playing a variety of "bad guy roles such as a soccer hooligan, drug addict, a nasty copper, a racist copper or a bent copper", he became somewhat disenchanted with acting, perceiving that the emphasis was not on talent, but on looks.

Around 1987 he decided to pursue a career in comedy, in part because:
"[The] one great advantage of stand-up comedy [is that] nobody gives a stuff about what you look like – as long as you're funny, and if you can do it, and people laugh, then you'll get bookings."
At the time, breaking into stand-up was not as difficult as it would later become, nor was there the modern infrastructure and chain businesses. Billingham cites his own route as a simple progression from 5-minute, unpaid "try-out" spots to (if one was deemed worthy) 10-, 20- and 30-minute paid slots. As he stated, "within a year, you could be playing the Comedy Store". Indeed, Billingham has headlined at the Comedy Store on many occasions, where he also appears regularly as a Master of Ceremonies.

Despite feeling rather ambivalent towards "serious" roles, Billingham still found considerable success by merging his careers as an actor and comic to work in comedy shows. He was the human face on the puppet-representation-of-celebrities series Spitting Image, and "the taller half" of the top double act the "Tracy Brothers" with Mike Mole from Bread & Circuses days (now guitarist with British comedy punk band Punks Not Dad), appearing regularly on the radio version of The Mary Whitehouse Experience. In 1988, he was seen in the children's comedy series News at Twelve, in which the central character "broadcasts his own (imaginary) TV news bulletin every evening".

Maid Marian and her Merry Men

Maid Marian and her Merry Men saw Billingham cast as Gary, a dim-but-lovable guard in the employ of the Sheriff of Nottingham (Tony Robinson), charged with keeping the peace (or causing the violence) in the village of Worksop, and hunting down Maid Marian (Kate Lonergan) and her band of "freedom fighters". As part of a double-act with Graeme (David Lloyd), Billingham was ostensibly one of the "baddies" but was nonetheless deeply sympathetic and well-liked.

After three successful award-winning series, both Billingham and Lloyd were helping creator-writer Robinson with plot and script ideas, both gaining co-writer credits on the first episode of series 4 – "Tunnel Vision". The episode produced spoofs of a number of cultural icons, including passing references to  Sonic the Hedgehog and Dungeons & Dragons, as well as a Richard O'Brien stand-in named "Robin O'Hood" who in the episode leads Gary and Graeme through the Merry Men's version of The Crystal Maze.

Tony Robinson, David Lloyd and Mark Billingham (in particular) remain friends, after having worked so closely together for four to five years, and Robinson can be seen taking partial credit for Billingham's literary career on the DVD release of Maid Marian (Series 3), in which the three discuss writing, both for the series and in general. The three announced in 2018 that they were working on a stage production of Maid Marian and her Merry Men.

Writing
As he has stated in a number of interviews, Billingham treats comedy – and his stand-up in particular – and writing as parts of a whole, seeing the two as complementary, using as they do:
"..the same 'Tricks'... [in particular] a strong opening. When you do stand-up, you walk out on stage and you have a minute – 60 seconds to hook them or they'll start booing. A late show at the Comedy Store is not easy, ditto with a book. As a writer you again have the duty to deliver – a reader has not got time to say, I'll give him 50 pages as it's not very good yet, but I hope it'll get better."
He also cites the big ending, and "pullback and reveal", whereby the audience (readership) is led along a specific path and lulled into thinking that they can guess the twist, before: "boom! it hits them from over there." In comedy, he says, it is a punchline; in crime "something a whole lot darker... [but] essentially it's a similar kind of [misdirection] technique."

It is no surprise then that Billingham turned his hand to writing comedy scripts for television, as well as continuing to act and appear in front of the camera at various points. He joined with David Lloyd to write episodes and act in the children's TV series Harry's Mad (based on the book by Dick King-Smith), and wrote and presented two series of BBC's What's That Noise?. Between 1997 and 1998, he (and friend Peter Cocks) wrote and co-starred in Granada TV's Knight School, for which the two also produced a novelisation.

He is, however, clearly less enamoured by scriptwriting than by novel-writing, noting that:
"I can write a six-part TV series and put my heart and soul into crafting it, and when it's done, it's jumped upon by a dozen people and torn to pieces and rewritten and messed about. Of those dozen people, perhaps two are qualified to do that."

In 2002, he was "in the middle of writing a screenplay for an Andrew Lloyd Webber musical and about to write a screenplay for a cult children's show," an original sci-fi drama for the BBC, but his prime consideration turned to writing novels.

Novels
In 2001, Billingham's first crime novel, Sleepyhead, was published in the UK by Little, Brown and Company. He is a self-confessed fan of crime fiction, "as well as a really serious collector" and has alleged that the expense of collecting books inspired him to get into interviewing and reviewing books, partly for the complimentary copies. Starting with a local newspaper, he progressed to providing reviews and interviews for SHOTS, and then to magazines, including Time Out, where he found himself interviewing people such as Michael Connelly, talking and learning from other writers.

Billingham became the first crime writer to win the Theakston's Old Peculier Crime Novel of the Year Award twice when his novel Death Message won in 2009, against strong opposition including Reginald Hill, Val McDermid, Ian Rankin and Lee Child.

Early writing
From an early age, Billingham can remember writing, often "funny" stories for purposes of popularity and enjoyment. As he grew older, and his interests moved towards crime fiction, he began to skew his writing that way, setting an early novel (the as-yet-unpublished The Mechanic) in his native Birmingham. Inspired by the comic-crime work of Carl Hiaasen and other authors, he attempted to use his experience as a stand-up comedian and crime fan to write a similarly comic novel. Ultimately he abandoned his unfinished novel and the comic-crime genre to focus on his other idea—a book that would become Sleepyhead.

Tom Thorne
Billingham created Detective Inspector Tom Thorne for his 2001 debut novel Sleepyhead, where a case of "Locked-In syndrome" reveals the dark depths of a twisted mind, as adept at toying with the DI as with the victims. This central character has since featured in the vast majority of his works, except In the Dark, released in August 2008, Rush of Blood, released in August 2012, and Die of Shame (May 2016), in which Thorne has only very minor roles. The author writes that "if writers want their readers to care about a character, they have to care themselves" and, as such, has imbued Thorne with a lot of his personal characteristics. The two share a birthday, a locale (London) and musical interests (a "love of country music both alt and cheesy" – although Billingham implies that it is Thornes fictional musical tastes that have grown on the author).

In talking about the creation and development of his central character, Billingham notes the difficulty and worry involved in trying to create a personality different from those in other existing, familiar and popular works:

[You] worry that you will be entering that world of the strange cliche-ed cop, but you soon realise that you have to get comfortable in that world. You think "Hang on, some of the clichés are part of that territory". It would like writing a Western and going "Oh no I've given him a horse! What a terrible cliché!" It's not a cliché – It's part and parcel of the genre – cowboys have six-guns, horses and stetsons and detectives have [a] past... problems [and] flaws, because if they don't, then there is nothing to read about.

Billingham's own website says that the underlying determination of Tom Thorne's character was that he would evolve as the series progressed, and remain unpredictable. While noting that many authors compile "thick dossiers" and "complex biographies" about their characters, noting every quirk and minor detail, Billingham shies away from such minutiae, calling it "limiting"—preferring instead to discover something anew about his own hero with each book, and to pass that novelty on to the reader:

The day a character becomes predictable is the day a writer should think about moving on, because the reader certainly will.

Thorne's internal continuity is important to his author—it is important that the events in his past affect who is in the present, although this very aspect of his character causes Billingham great difficulty in describing him without giving away plot twists. Suffice to say that "[h]e works on the Metropolitan Police Murder Squad [and at] the time of the first book, he is forty-one years old". Thorne's surname comes from fellow Comedy Store stand-up Paul Thorne, and the (sur)names of other comics and comedians are liberally peppered throughout the series.

Sleepyhead was released in August 2001, and made it onto the Sunday Times "Top Ten Bestseller" list, becoming "the biggest selling debut novel of that Summer". In December 2009 it was listed as one of the 100 novels that shaped the decade and was chosen as one of the titles for World Book Night in 2011.

Scaredy Cat inspiration
In 1997, Billingham became a crime victim, as he and his writing partner Peter Cocks were kidnapped and held hostage in a Manchester hotel room. Turning the event into inspiration for his second Thorne novel, Scaredy Cat, he wrote:

The general theme of Scaredy Cat is really the power of fear, and that fear is a very powerful weapon, and if you are prepared to instil it, you have a very powerful weapon that is every bit as dangerous as a gun or a knife. Also what happened to me in that hotel room fed directly into a sub-plot in Scaredy Cat with some very nasty crimes carried out in hotel rooms.

The two were kept bound and gagged in their hotel room by a trio of masked men who stole items and credit cards from them. Billingham recalls being terrified by the sheer audacity of the criminals, who managed to instil a feeling of menace and fear into their victims, a theme which was later fed into his novels–"that if one person is able to scare someone so much, they can make them do anything". The Scaredy Cat storyline thus presents the scenario of tandem serial killers, two individuals ostensibly working together, creating an added air of terror and expectation whenever one of them strikes.

More Thorne
On the heels of 2001's Sleepyhead and 2002's Scaredy Cat, Thorne returned in 2003's Lazybones, investigating the killing of a convicted rapist, and finding it difficult to become involved in the case, since he has little real sympathy for the victim. A messy contract killer and the past cases of a former colleague blur together in The Burning Girl as the past meets the present in a symphony of violence. Thorne's involvement in a previous case affects his ability to investigate an increasing death toll among the homeless of London in Lifeless, while a kidnapping case forms the backbone of 2006's Buried. Death Message, the Thorne novel published in August 2007 sees him haunted by a psychopath he has already put behind bars, but who is reaching out from prison to manipulate the world outside. After resting Thorne for the standalone thriller In The Dark (although he does appear in a very minor role), Billingham returned to his perennial character in 2009 with Bloodline, in the 2010 novel From The Dead and in 2011 with Good As Dead. After a break for a second standalone thriller, Rush of Blood, Thorne returned in 2013 in "The Dying Hours". Five more Thorne novels have since been published.

The first chapter of each of Billingham's Tom Thorne books can be downloaded from his website.

Television adaptations
Sky1's Thorne adaptation started broadcasting in October 2010, with acclaimed actor David Morrissey starring as Tom Thorne. The first three episodes were an adaptation of Sleepyhead and were directed by Stephen Hopkins (24, Californication, The Life and Death of Peter Sellers). The final three episodes were an adaptation of Scaredy Cat, and guest-starred Canadian actress Sandra Oh (of Grey's Anatomy).

His standalone novel In The Dark was adapted as a miniseries of the same name by the BBC in 2017. An adaptation of another standalone novel, Rush of Blood, is currently being developed for US television.

Awards and nominations

TV
Billingham has received nominations and awards related to all aspects of his various careers. What's That Noise (which he wrote and presented) won the 1995 Royal Television Society award for "Best Entertainment Programme", while Knight School was nominated for the RTS's "Best Children's Drama" award two years running.

Novels
Scaredy Cat (2002) won the Sherlock Award for "Best Detective Novel Created by a UK Author", and was also nominated for the Crime Writers Association Gold Dagger for "Best Crime Novel of the Year".
Lifeless (2005) was nominated for BCA "Crime Thriller of the Year" Award in 2006.

Billingham's novel Lazybones won the Theakston's Old Peculier Crime Novel of the Year Award 2004 and he won the same award in 2009 for his novel Death Message. In The Dark was nominated for the Crime Writers Association Gold Dagger at the 2009 Crime Thriller Awards. In 2011, Billingham was inducted into the ITV3 Crime Thriller Awards Hall of Fame.

Billingham was shortlisted for the 2015 Dagger in the Library UK Crime Writers' Association award for an author's body of work in British libraries. He was shortlisted again in 2019 and won the award in 2022.

Recreation
In-between writing, acting and stand-up, Billingham finds time to support Wolverhampton Wanderers, although his protagonist Thorne supports Tottenham Hotspur.

The Other Half
In 2015, Billingham collaborated on a musical project called The Other Half with My Darling Clementine, reading an original story alongside a soundtrack by the Americana band.

Podcasts
In September 2015 Billingham and co-host Michael Carlson released the six-part podcast The Crime Vault Live, with the last episode released in January 2016.

Billingham currently hosts UKTV's crime podcast A Stab in the Dark. Each episode includes a discussion on a particular theme from crime fiction and crime drama, and has featured guests including David Morrissey, Val McDermid, Michael Connelly and Ann Cleeves.

Personal life
Billingham lives in North London with his wife Claire and their two children.

Bibliography
Knight School (with Peter Cocks) (Hodder & Stoughton, 1998),

As "Will Peterson" (with Peter Cocks)
Triskellion (Walker Books Ltd, February 2008), 
Triskellion 2: The Burning (Walker Books, February 2009), 
Triskellion 3: The Gathering (Walker Books, February 2010)

Tom Thorne
 Sleepyhead (Little, Brown & Company, August 2001), ; William Morrow US, July 2002, 
 Scaredy Cat (Little, Brown & Company, July 2002), ; Time Warner UK, November 2002, ; William Morrow US, June 2003, 
 Lazybones (Little, Brown & Company, July 2003), ; ; William Morrow US (June 2004), 
 The Burning Girl (Little, Brown & Company, July 2004), ; William Morrow US (June 2005), 
 Lifeless (Little, Brown & Company, May 2005), ; Scorpion Press, June 2005, ; William Morrow US, September 2006, 
 Buried (Little, Brown & Company, May 2006), ; Orbit, May 2006, ; (HarperCollins, August 2007), 
 Death Message (Little, Brown & Company, August 2007), 
Bloodline (Little, Brown & Company, August 2009), 
From the Dead (Little, Brown & Company, August 2010), 
Good as Dead (Little, Brown & Company, August 2011), . Retitled US The Demands (Mulholland Books, June 2012), 
The Dying Hours (2013)
The Bones Beneath (2014)
Time of Death (2015)
Love Like Blood (2017)
The Killing Habit (2018)
Their Little Secret (2019)
Cry Baby (prequel to Sleepyhead) (2020)
The Murder Book (2022)

Other Crime
 In the Dark (Little, Brown & Company, August 2008), 
 In the Dark includes Tom Thorne as a minor character.
"Dancing Towards The Blade" in Men From Boys by John Harvey (ed.) (Arrow Books, September 2004), 
Other contributors include: Dennis Lehane • Michael Connelly • George Pelecanos • Jeffery Deaver • Lawrence Block
"Stroke of Luck" in Like A Charm by Karin Slaughter (ed.) (Century, February 2004), 
Other contributors include: Laura Lippman • Lee Child • John Connolly • Lynda La Plante • John Harvey • Peter Robinson • Fidelis Morgan • Val McDermid • Karin Slaughter• Emma Donoghue• Denise Mina • Kelley Armstrong • Jane Haddam
 "Introduction" in The High Window by Raymond Chandler (Penguin)
Rush of Blood (Little, Brown & Company, August 2012), 
 Rush of Blood contains Tom Thorne as a minor character.
Die of Shame (Little, Brown & Company, May 2016),  
 Die of Shame contains Tom Thorne as a minor character.
Rabbit Hole (Little, Brown & Company, July 2021),

Partial screenography

Writer
Maid Marian and Her Merry Men (1989–94)
"Tunnel Vision" (1993)
Harry's Mad (1993–96)
various episodes
Knight School (1997–98)
various episodes

Actor
Dempsey and Makepeace (1984) – Steve (1985)
Juliet Bravo (1980) – Doyle (1985)
Boon (1986) – Policeman (1986)
News at Twelve (1988) – Wayne Harris (1988)
The Bill (1984) – Pete (1989)
Birds of a Feather (1989) – Phil the Plumber (1989)
Maid Marian and her Merry Men (1989–94) – Gary (1989–94)
The Upper Hand (1990) – Philly Fingers (1993)
Harry's Mad (1993–96) – Terry Crumm (1993–96)
Knight School (1997–98) – Scrubbe (1997–98)

References

External links
 
 Official US website
 Mark Billingham at Little, Brown & Company
 The Other Half Show website
Mark Billingham's top ten detectives, at The Guardian
Mark Billingham's profile at The Comedy Store
 Interview with Mark Billingham in Shots Ezine August 2012

The story behind The Bones Beneath - Online Essay by Mark Billingham, at Upcoming4.me

1961 births
Living people
21st-century English novelists
English crime fiction writers
English crime writers
English thriller writers
English mystery writers
English male television actors
English screenwriters
English stand-up comedians
English comedy writers
People from Birmingham, West Midlands
People educated at King Edward VI Camp Hill School for Boys
English male screenwriters
English male novelists
21st-century British screenwriters
21st-century English male writers